is a Japanese model, actress, and tarento from Tokyo who has modelled for a number of magazines and commercials as well as acting in theatre, film, television and radio. Affiliated with Wintarts, she graduated from Reitaku University's Faculty of Economics.

Works

DVD
Watashi-meguri (22 Apr 2016, Takeshobo)*Simultaneously released on Blu-ray Disc
Sonna Vacance (2 Mar 2018, Happinet)*Simultaneously released on Blu-ray Disc

Photo albums
Ningyo (14 Sep 2016, Shueisha)
Rashin Moemi Katayama (5 Jan 2017, Kodansha) Shooting—Andy Chao

Photo exhibitions
2017 Nude Collabo Energy (2—9 Jan 2017, Shibuya Hikarie) Shooting—Andy Chao

Appearances

Magazines
Weekly Playboy (Shueisha, Sep, Dec 2014, Feb 2015, Jun (*cover), Sep (*cover), Oct, Dec 2016 (*cover), Jan, Jun 2017)
Weekly Young Jump (2015 No. 11, released Feb — published online, Shueisha) — Genseki 10!!
Cyzo (Cyzo, No. Aug 2015 (released 18 Jul)*cover, No. Jan 2017 (released 19 Dec 2016))
Big Comic Spirits (Shogakukan, Feb 2016)*cover
Shūkan Gendai (Kodansha, Apr, Jul, Aug, Oct, Dec 2016)
Weekly Playboy Extra Published Gravure Special (Shueisha, No. 10 Jun 2016 (released 28 Apr))
Circus Max (KK Bestsellers, No. Jun 2016 (released 10 May), No. Apr 2017 (released 10 Mar))*cover
Men's Joker (KK Bestsellers, No. Jul 2016 (released 10 Jun))
Weekly Asahi Geinō (Tokuma Shoten, No. 21 Jul 2016 (published 12 Jul))*in Terry Ito's interview
Shūkan Bunshun (Bungeishunjū, No. 25 Aug 2016 (published 17 Aug))*"Genshoku Bijo Zukan"
Ima, Ichiban sugoi Gravure Bijo-tachi (KK Bestsellers, Circus Max Special Issue Sep 2016 (released 29 Aug))
Golf Jōhō Magazine: Waggle (Jitsugyo no Nihon Sha, No. Nov 2016 (released 21 Sep))
Friday (Kodansha, No. 14 Oct, (released 30 Sep), No. 16 Dec 2016 (released 2 Dec)*cover, No. 10 Feb 2017 (released 27 Jan))
Bike Jōhō-shi: GooBike Shutoken-ban (Proto Corporation, No. 7 Nov 2016 (released 7 Oct))*cover
Flash (Kobunsha, Oct 2016)
Young Champion (Akita Shoten, 2016 No.21 (released 11 Oct))*cover
Weekly ASCII (Kadokawa, No.1097 (released 11 Oct 2016))*electronic ver. cover
Shūkan Taishū (Futabasha, No. 28 Nov 2016 (released 14 Nov))*cover and "Zubari Honne de Bijo Talk"
Mamor (Fusosha, No. Jan 2017 (released 22 Nov 2016)*cover, No. Jan 2018 (released 21 Nov 2017)*Special Calendar 2018)
Young Gangan (Square Enix, No. Aug 2017 (released 7 Apr))&cover and top gravure
Shūkan Spa! (Fusosha, No. 1 Aug 2017 (released 25 Jul))*cover)
Softdarts Bible (San-ei Shobo, released 27 Jul 2017, 26 May 2018*cover)
The Television (Kadokawa, released 2 Aug 2017)
Shukan Jitsuwa (Nihon Journal Publishing, No. 19 Apr 2018 (released 5 Apr))*cover

Stage
Gekidan Sora-kan Engine Produce Tokyo Zoom II (30 Jun — 4 Jul 2011, Air Studio)
Gekidan Sora-kan Engine Produce 7-Chōme 16-Banchi: Yume-ya ~3-Kai mawatte One no Maki~ (2—7 Nov 2011, Theatre Rapport)
Harapeko Penguin! 19th Performance Asahi Ikka no Chōsen-jō (31 Jan — 3 Feb 2013, Kichijoji Theater)
Tokyo Theatrical Club Produce Performance Vol.6 Summer's Rain (Kari): Datte Sukidakara! (25—30 Jun 2014, Hiroyuki Toono Hiroshi Memorial Theatre) — as Joanna
Tokyo Theatrical Club Produce Performance Vol.7 Blackjack ni Yoroshiku ~Gankanja-hen~ (3—8 Sep 2014, Rikkōkai Hall) — as Noriko Kodama
Sōzō Shūdan Seikatsu Kōjō Iinkai 32nd Performance Organs ~Onna Akahige Funtō-ki~ (20—24 May 2015, Ginza Hakuhinkan Theater) — as Aya Serizawa
FPadvance produce Bank Bang Bang Lessonson (2—6 Sep 2015, Senbon Sakura Hall)
Tsuki o Koete ~Over the Taboo~ (21—25 Dec 2015, Jinbōchō Kagetsu)
Kanda Tokikita-gumihon Performance Dai Kaichōban!! Soshite Ryōma wa Korosareta ~Bakumatsu Mon dakedo Argentine Tango kara Kayōkyoku made nandemo Tsukatte moīyone~ (27 Apr — 1 May 2016, Haiyu-za Theater) — as Yae
Yokohama Graffiti (26—31 Jul, Haiyu-za Theater/6—7 Aug 2016, Prefectural Citizen Mirai Hall) — as Julie [Juri Tachibana]
"Straydog" Produce Performance Kanashiki Tenshi (10—13 Nov, Kichijoji Theater/26—27 Nov 2016, Hep Hall) — Starring; as Kazumi
Romancing SaGa: The Stage ~Rohne ga Moeru Hi~ (15—23 Apr, Sunshine Theatre/28—30 Apr, Sankei Hall Breeze/3—4 May, Aichi Prefectural Art Theatre, large hall/6—7 May 2017, Kurume City Plaza The Grand Hall) — as Byūnei

TV dramas
Seicho Matsumoto Special Project Kyōhan-sha (30 Sep 2015, TX)
OL desuga, Kyaba-jō hajimemashita (Jun—Jul 2016, MBS—TBS) — as Mari
Aibō season 15 Episode 6 "Gift" (22 Feb 2017, EX) — as Minami Arimura
Taiga drama Naotora: The Lady Warlord (21 May 2017, NHK) — as Woman with feelings
Hello Hari Nezumi (14 Jul — 15 Sep 2017, TBS) — as Moemi
Nichiyō Wide Shūchakueki Series 31: Satsujin no Hana Kyaku (16 Jul 2017, EX)
Nichiyō Wide Shihō Kyōkan Yoshiko Hotaka (1 Oct 2017, EX)
Drama 24 Shinjuku Seven (13 Oct 2017, TX) — as Asuka
Haken no Kyaba-jō–Ayaka (3 Dec 2017, ABC) — as Kasumi Kanuma
Shin Series Seisaku Kinen! Asamade Tokumei Kakarichō Hitoshi Tadano Christmas Special (25 Dec 2017, EX) — as Arisa Makimura
Izakaya bottakuri (Apr—Jun 2018, BS12) — Starring; as Mine
Friday Night Drama Kaseifu no Mitazono (27 Apr 2018, EX) — as Rumi
Taiga drama Idaten (2019, NHK) — as Chii-chan
13 Assassins (2020, NHK)

Other TV programmes
Koisuru Coming Out (2014, CX)
Harajuku Book Cafe (2014, BS Fuji)
Bakumon! Saikyō Dokkiri-sai (2014, TBS)
All-Star Thanksgiving '14 Spring (2014, TBS) assistant
Cutting Edge: IT Saizensen (2016, BS-TBS)
Kono Aki dōshitemo Hairitai: Nippon no Hitō Best 10 (2016, TX)
Shinya Kissa Sujiganeze (22, 29 Jan, 5 Feb 2017, CX)
Nikenme dōsuru?: Tsumami no Hanashi (26 Aug 2017, TX)
Moemi Katayama no Moemiru: Sonna Vacance (5 Jan 2018 —, BS Fuji)*First Kanmuri programme
Jikkuri Kii Tarō: Star Kinkyō (Hi) Hōkoku (23 Feb 2018, TX)

Films
Kyōkasho ni nai! (18 Jun 2016, Nippon Shuppan) — as Yayoi Gogatsu
Kyōkasho ni nai! 2 (19 Jun 2016, Nippon Shuppan) — as Yayoi Gogatsu
Scoop! (1 Oct 2016, Toho)
Gekijō-ban: Shikabane Shūgoku (2017, Gekijō-ban: Shikabane Shūgoku Production Committee) — Starring; as Mikoto
Okoshino-hen (3 Jun)
Yuino-hen (10 Jun)
Megamisama (10 Jun 2017, Media Mix Japan) — as Naomi Takasu
Fumiko's Feet (10 Feb 2018, TBS Service) — Starring; as Fumiko Ashida
Shoplifters (8 Jun 2018, Gaga) — as Nozomi Hojo
Lenses on Her Heart (after Summer 2018) — as Masae Akino
The Gun (2018)
Tezuka's Barbara (2019)
Go Away, Ultramarine (2019)
We Couldn't Become Adults (2021)
1446: An Eternal Minute (2022)

Radio
Pakkun Tamago (21 Oct 2012 — 11 Apr 2013, MBS Radio)
Shigoto to Jinsei o Omoshiroku suru~Shuta Ujike no Next View (Jan 2015 —, bayfm) regular

Advertisements
The Fukui Bank (2014)
6waves "Smartphone Application Mikuni Tenmu: Honkaku Senryaku Battle" (2016)

Music videos
SiM "A" (2017)
SiM "The Sound Of Breath" (2017)

Internet
Juken Sapuri (Mar 2015 —, Recruit)
SportsNaviDo Moemi Katayama no Honolulu Half Chōsen-ki (Mar 2015 —, Yahoo! Japan)
The North Wind and The Sun: The Movie [Kirin no Dogoshi <Nama>] (May 2016 —, Kirin)

Internet programmes
Shinsō Kaimei! Chōsa Hōdō Variety: Katte ni Deguchi Chōsa (8, 15 Jan 2017 —, AbemaTV)
Chigau de Show! (26 Feb 2017 —, AbemaTV)
Ogiyahagi no "Busu" TV (4 Dec 2017 —, AbemaTV)

Internet dramas
Tokumei Kakarichō Tadano Hitoshi: AbemaTV Original (4 Feb 2017, AbemaTV) — as Arisa Makimura
Spin-off Drama Otona Kōkō: Episode 0 (8 Oct 2017, au Video Pass—AbemaTV) — as Miwa Komaki
Haken no Kyaba-jō–Ayaka (27 Nov 2017, AbemaTV) — as Kasumi Kanuma

References

External links
 — Wintarts 
 — Ameba Blog 
 — Diamond Blog 
 
 

Japanese stage actresses
Japanese television personalities
Japanese gravure idols
1990 births
Living people
Models from Tokyo Metropolis